Nemapteryx is a genus of sea catfishes found mostly in coastal marine and brackish waters from South Asia to Australia with one species (N. augusta) occurring exclusively in fresh waters of the Fly River in Papua New Guinea. There are currently six recognized species in this genus.

Species
 Nemapteryx armiger (De Vis, 1884) (Threadfin catfish )
 Nemapteryx augusta (T. R. Roberts, 1978) (Short barbelled catfish)
 Nemapteryx bleekeri (Popta, 1900) (Bleeker's catfish)
 Nemapteryx caelata (Valenciennes, 1840) (Engraved catfish)
 Nemapteryx macronotacantha (Bleeker, 1846)
 Nemapteryx nenga (F. Hamilton, 1822)

References
 

Ariidae
Catfish genera
Taxa named by James Douglas Ogilby